AccuRx is a British software company working in the health sector. 

The company was co-founded by Jacob Haddad and Laurence Bargery, who met and subsequently founded the company at Entrepreneur First in 2016.

Accurx's main product is Chain SMS, a messaging program used by doctor surgeries to communicate with patients. The program runs on desktop computers and sends SMS text messages. It can integrate with some software used in GP surgeries—SystmOne and EMIS Health. Chain SMS was launched in February 2018 and as of February 2019, was used in more than 1,400 GP surgeries in the UK. Since the COVID-19 pandemic in the UK, Accurx integrated a videotelephony system into Chain SMS, using Whereby, and subsequently "more than 90 percent of primary care clinics in England are now using it" for online appointments.

SMS messages from Chain SMS appear from "GPSurgery" by default.

University Hospitals of Leicester NHS Trust used Accurx’s patient messaging feature in 2022 to communicate with patients via SMS to ask if they still needed their overdue first appointment or follow-up appointment.  10% said they no longer needed the service.

Its patient-centred viewing system, Record View, was launched in May 2022.  It permits clinicians to view a read-only summary of a patient’s GP medical record with the patient’s explicit permission.

References

External links
 

Health care companies of the United Kingdom
Software companies established in 2016
Software companies of the United Kingdom
Telecommunications companies established in 2016
Videotelephony
Telehealth
British companies established in 2016 
Health care companies established in 2016 
Telecommunications companies of the United Kingdom